This is a list of Brazilian television related events from 1984.

Events

Debuts
Corpo a Corpo

Television shows

1970s
Turma da Mônica (1976–present)
Sítio do Picapau Amarelo (1977–1986)

1980s
Balão Mágico (TV series) (1983-1986)

Births
11 January - Milena Toscano, actress & model
10 March - Carol Castro, actress & model
16 May - André Arteche, actor
14 June - Letícia Lima, actress
18 June - Fernanda Souza, actress & TV host
12 August - Joana Balaguer, actress
8 September - André Vasco, actor & TV host
14 September - Fernanda Vasconcellos, actress
11 October - Juliana Didone, actress & former model

Deaths

See also
1984 in Brazil
List of Brazilian films of 1984